Vasil "Chuck" Bodak (June 3, 1916 – February 6, 2009) was an American boxing cutman and trainer who worked with over 50 world champions including Muhammad Ali, Rocky Marciano, Tommy Hearns, Julio César Chávez, Evander Holyfield, Edward Necco and Oscar De La Hoya.

Bodak was born June 3, 1916, in Gary, Indiana where his involvement in boxing began circa 1929 at Schonfield's Athletic Club.  In 1942 he  enlisted in the U.S. Army.  He survived the Battle of The Bulge after being shot twice and was awarded two Purple Hearts.   An amateur fighter himself, Bodak coached the National Golden Gloves team in the late 1950s and began working with young teenager named Cassius Clay who changed his name to Muhammad Ali.  Bodak trained Ali for the last four years of his amateur career that culminated with the winning of a Gold Medal for the light-heavyweight competition at the 1960 Summer Olympic Games held in Rome, Italy.

He was known for his trademark headbands with photos of his fighters as well as his handmade jewelry and collages that he liked to give away as gifts.

Bodak moved to Chicago, Illinois in 1958 where he was a boxing coach for the Catholic Youth Organization (CYO) for many years before moving to California. Even though advancing in age, he continued to work in the ring and was active in the boxing community until he suffered a stroke in 2007 at the age of 90. He died in a motor accident on February 6, 2009, at the age of 92 in Orange County, California.

Awards and recognition
Bodak was inducted into the World Boxing Hall of Fame, "Expanded Category" (Managers & Trainers).

In October 2008, he received a Lifetime Achievement Award in person at a WBC Legends of Boxing Museum ceremony.

In 1993, he was honored by the Cauliflower Alley Club.

Bibliography
Bodak co-authored Boxing Basics, a book published in 1979 that outlines the fundamentals of boxing including psychological preparation, physical conditioning, offensive and defensive strategies, and ring psychology.

Acting roles
Bodak played the role of Cesar's cutman in the 1999 film Play It to the Bone and portrayed himself in two documentaries, More Than Famous in 2003 and The Distance in 2006.

References

External links
 Chuck Bodak honored by the boxing world
 Boxing Loses True Hero in Chuck Bodak
 Chuck Bodak Interview conducted by Thomas Gerbasi
 Chuck Bodak's Bio

1916 births
2009 deaths
American boxing trainers
Sportspeople from Gary, Indiana
Sportspeople from California
Cutmen
Road incident deaths in California
United States Army personnel of World War II
American shooting survivors
United States Army soldiers